The 2012–13 season was Oud-Heverlee Leuven's 11th competitive season in professional football. It was their second season in the Belgian Pro League. A promising start by OH Leuven and a 5-match winning streak in October resulted in a third place after 13 matchdays, but thereafter the team dropped in the standings to finally end 10th. In the playoffs, OH Leuven won their group but then lost the playoff final to Gent. In the Belgian Cup, OHL immediately lost their first match just like the previous season, this time going out to Oostende.

Season Overview

April/May
On April 27, a first transfer for the new season is announced, as Belgian defender Kenny Thompson signs for OHL, coming from Lierse and two weeks later on May 14, OHL also signs Christopher Verbist from Standard Liège. Verbist played an impressive 2011–12 season in the Belgian Second Division, as he was on loan to Second Division champions Charleroi from Standard Liège.

On May 25, there is a lot of transfer activity at OHL, as two players leave and one is signed. Both Wingback Lionel Gendarme and central defender Pieter Nys decide to sign with a second division team. Gendarme moves to Oostende, while Nys moves to Dutch side Sparta. Meanwhile, on the same day, OHL confirms the signature of Günther Vanaudenaerde from recently relegated Westerlo. Due to injury, Vanaudenaerde missed most of the previous season.

June
Being founded in 2002, Oud-Heverlee Leuven celebrates its tenth anniversary. During the festivities, results of the "merit" award are presented. Through a web poll, the OHL fans chose François Sterchele as the player having the most merit during the ten inaugural years. Sterchele played for OHL during the 2004–05 season, in which OHL successfully promoted to the Belgian Second Division, with Sterchele the club top scorer, including eight goals during the promotion playoffs. Other players completing the top 5 were (in order): Bjorn Ruytinx, Jordan Remacle, Joeri Vastmans and Hans Goethuys.

After signing Günther Vanaudenaerde from Westerlo earlier, OHL confirms also the signing of Westerlo youngster Wout Bastiaens on June 5  and announces a few days later that another promising  youngster joins the squad as Ben Yagan (17) is promoted from the reserve team to the first team for the coming season.

On June 11, the Belgian Pro League fixtures for the 2012–13 season are announced. Oud-Heverlee Leuven opens the season with an away match to Mons on 28 July 2012. One week later, Genk will be the opponent for the first home match. Later that same day, OHL first announces that Arnold Rijsenburg has signed as part of the staff, becoming the second assistant first team coach for head manager Ronny Van Geneugden, before spreading the news that the club has signed yet another Belgian defender. Twenty-six-year-old Ludovic Buysens has signed a two-year deal, signing from recently relegated Sint-Truiden.

Three days later, OHL sign a fifth Belgian defender with Jonas De Roeck. The experienced 32-year-old was a free player after his contract had expired at Bundesliga team Augsburg. Meanwhile, Sint-Truiden announce the signing of Maxime Annys from OHL on their website. Annys had been with OHL since 2009, but was deemed surplus and allowed to leave.

In need of a new goalkeeper since the departure of Thomas Kaminski following the end of the previous season, OHL finally choose to sign Logan Bailly.  With Bailly, OHL sign a 26 year old Belgian international goalkeeper, who has already gained 8 caps for the Red Devils. Bailly gained fame when playing for Genk, leading to a lucrative transfer to Borussia Mönchengladbach in 2008. After some less successful loans, Bailly now moves to OHL, hoping to relaunch his career under Ronny Van Geneugden, who he knows from his period at Genk. Bailly is given a one-year contract.

Initial signs were already bad as Captain Bjorn Ruytinx was forced to walk off the field with a swollen knee during the friendly match against Kampenhout on 27 June, but two days later the feared news is confirmed that Ruytinx has indeed suffered an anterior cruciate ligament injury. Ruytinx, who had just signed a one-year contract extension in March 2012 to perform one more season for Oud-Heverlee Leuven, is now expected to be out for about 6 months.

On the last day of June 2012, OHL announce the signing of Gambian forward Ibou, who signs a three-year contract with an optional extra season. He is transferred from Kortrijk, where he has played since 2008, although that includes a six-month loan to Mechelen and a season-long loan to Mons. Later that same day, news is released that new signings Logan Bailly and Kenny Thompson are both out for weeks. Goalkeeper Bailly has suffered a broken finger during training, while Thompson is suffering from meningitis.

July
Although it was already known that Ghanaian striker Ibrahim Salou was going to be released, the news becomes official only when Belgian Third Division team La Louvière Centre announce the signing of Salou on their website on July 18. OHL draws much more media attention on July 20, when the transfer of last season OHL top scorer Jordan Remacle to Gent is now officially announced. Following weeks of rumours considering the future of Remacle, who requested a transfer and even handed in a doctors note to allow him to stay absent from training, the deal is now complete. One day later, this is followed by the news of signing Evariste Ngolok, a Belgian midfielder. After Wout Bastiaens and Günther Vanaudenaerde, Ngolok is the third player coming from Westerlo to sign for OHL.

In their opening match of the 2012–13 Belgian Pro League on July 28, Oud-Heverlee Leuven suffer a heavy loss, going down 5–2 away to Mons, with goals for OHL coming from Karel Geraerts and new signing Ibou, who scores his first goal for OHL.

August
OHL presents the team kits for the new season, the main difference being that the logo of head sponsor Option is now blending in with the shirt. The home kits remain white, while the away kits will now be green, with the third kit being coloured red. Head coach Ronny Van Geneugden claims it to be "a youthful kit, matching the youthful character of our supporters, who will surely identify themselves with it". One day later, the 5 000th season ticket is sold. This is a large increase of the record for OH Leuven, as the record stood at 4 772, set during the previous season.

Playing for the first time in their new kits, the team bounce back from trailing 0–2 with 15 minutes to go, to draw 2–2 with Genk in their first home match of the season. During that same match, defender Günther Vanaudenaerde tears one of the muscles in his abdomen and is expected to be out for 4 to 6 weeks.

The following week, transfer activity is again increased, as OHL loans out three Belgian players to Belgian Second Division team Antwerp. Defender Nicky Hayen and midfielders Kevin Roelandts and Jorn Vermeulen join the Antwerp team for one season, while Christian Pouga is presented as the latest new signing. The 26 year old striker from Cameroon is signed from Portuguese team Marítimo.

Only 34 seconds into the match against Gent, Ibou scores his third of the season. Eventually the match against the new team of Jordan Remacle ends in a 1–1 draw, a small revenge for OHL after the 6–1 loss during the previous season. One week later, OHL books a first win, coming back twice to beat Cercle Brugge 3–2 at home, with Evariste Ngolok scoring his first goal for OHL. Other goals came from Ibou and Geraerts.

Although various media already reported the coming of Ivorian defender Ali Bamba to OHL on loan from Le Mans, the deal is cancelled on 21 August 2012 after Bamba fails his medical tests.

Against an Anderlecht squad in which no less than 8 first team players have been replaced to keep them fresh for their upcoming Champions League fixture, OHL draws 1–1 at Den Dreef. For the fifth game in a row, Ibou gets on the scoresheet, thereby taking the lead in the goal scorer standings, however he also suffers an injury, causing him to be sidelined for about a week.

On the last day of the transfer window, OHL confirmed the signing of the 23-year-old Zimbabwean midfielder Ovidy Karuru from French side US Boulogne. It was also announced that Antoine Palate would be loaned for one season to Diegem Sport in the Belgian Third Division.

September
An injury time goal from Christian Pouga secures one point for OHL away to Lierse. The absence of Ibou is clear on the pitch, as OHL struggles to create big scoring opportunities.

OHL enters the draw for the Belgian Cup and is drawn away to Belgian Second Division team Oostende in the 16th finals. Should OH Leuven get past Oostende, they will play another away game, against the winner of the match between Brussels and Waasland-Beveren.

After one week break because of international football, OHL plays a dull match at home against Zulte Waregem. With just under ten minutes to play, Zulte Waregem scores the only goal of the match to give OHL a first home loss of the season. OHL also drops into 14th position, just two points clear of the relegation zone.

Available as a free player, OH Leuven adds 29-year-old Brazilian defender Robson to the squad on September 20, giving him a one-year contract with a possible one-year extension. Robson had been training with the team already for several weeks and previously played for Marítimo, alongside Christian Pouga.

Although Lokeren took the lead twice, OHL manages to keep one point in the away match at Daknam, with first Wim Raymaekers equalizing to 1–1 and finally Karel Geraerts scoring the 2–2 equaliser just before the end of the match. During the following midweek match, OHL is kicked straight out of the cup in their first match, for the second consecutive season. Against Oostende, a red card for Ludovic Buysens and a handling error by Logan Bailly leading to the opening goal allow the second division team to eventually win easily, by a score of 2–1. For OHL, youngster Joren Dehond manages to score his first goal of the season.

After the disappointing cup loss, OHL responds with a spectacular home win against newly promoted Waasland-Beveren. After two goals from Christian Pouga and a stunning free kick by Stefán Gíslason, Ibou completes the game with two more goals, the last one in injury time just seconds after he missed a penalty kick.

October
In October, OHL continues where they left off and even improves their level, extending the streak of consecutive matches won to five. First the team starts with a 0–4 win away to Charleroi in which Chuka, who had been struggling to find the net, completes a hattrick. The final goal came again from Ibou, who now ties with Club Brugge striker Carlos Bacca for the lead in the standings for top scorer with 8 goals. Thereafter, a previously undefeated Club Brugge comes to lose at Den Dreef. After going down already with under five minutes played due to a goal from Carlos Bacca, Ibou scores a hattrick to race past Bacca in the top scorers' standings with 11 goals from the same number of matches. Ovidy Karuru adds his first goal for OHL to result in a final 4–1 score. With the win, OH Leuven moves into position 6 in the standings. Also, for the first time since the expansion of Den Dreef to a capacity of 9.500, OHL plays in front of a sellout crowd. Since the 1970s, there have not been that number of supporters at a football match in the region.

The fourth win is achieved away to Beerschot, where OHL struggled for an hour until Kenneth Van Goethem put the ball past Stijn Stijnen. After taking the lead, the team controlled the flow of play and extended the lead further through goals from Karel Geraerts and Stefán Gíslason. In injury time, Hernán Losada scored the consolation goal for Beerschot from a penalty kick. During a midweek match, OHL moves into third place in the standings after the winning streak is extended to five matches against KV Mechelen. For a second consecutive sellout crowd and with only 52 seconds played, Christian Pouga heads in the first goal from an assist by Ibou. After an equalizer by Mechelen, OHL scores two more goals through Chuka and Ibou to win the match 3–1. Downside is the injury of central defender Wim Raymaekers, who suffers a knee injury during the first half. Although the injury is less severe than originally feared, Raymaekers still has to undergo surgery and is thereafter estimated to be out for 4 to 5 months.

November
After moving into third position following the month of October, OHL starts struggling in November. A 2–0 loss away to Standard Liège is followed by a lacklustre 0–0 draw at home against Kortrijk and a loss against Mons, also at Den Dreef. In the latter match, an error by Jonas De Roeck allows Mons striker Jérémy Perbet to score the opening goal after just two minutes. Thereafter, Perbet completes a hattrick which means the late goal by Christian Pouga is no more than a consolation. OHL ends the month with a positive note however, as the team holds Genk to a 1–1 draw, with Ibou converting an injury time penalty to grab the point in Genk. With that, OHL moves into 8th place, seemingly headed for a safe mid-table position as the gap with the relegation zone has grown to 11 points.

December
Although Karel Geraerts manages to equalise after an early goal by Gent, OHL fails to win, as the home game ends in a 1–1 draw. One day later, 26-year-old first goalkeeper Logan Bailly signs a 1-year contract extension, keeping him in Leuven until 2014.

One week after the draw with Gent, OHL scores a third consecutive 1–1 draw, away to bottom league team Cercle Brugge. Both goals are scored through a penalty kick, with the goal from Ibou cancelled out by Eiður Guðjohnsen. Although a fourth 1–1 draw would have been welcome away to Anderlecht to deny them an eight consecutive league win, OH Leuven does lose by a score of 2–1, the first-ever loss by OHL against Anderlecht in the league. Ibou scored the goal for OHL after a fast counterattack and as OH Leuven had several opportunities, coach Van Geneugden states:"I have congratulated my players after the match because we should be proud of our achievement today". Nevertheless, OH Leuven has now suffered 7 matches without a win.

Just two weeks after first goalkeeper Bailly, it is now second goalkeeper Yves Lenaerts who prolongs his contract. In contrary to Bailly however, Lenaerts extends his contract by three seasons, to 2016.

The non-winning streak of OHL continues, as before the end of the year, two more matches are played without a win. First Lierse, who are fighting to avoid relegation, come to Den Dreef to score a point in a 2–2 draw, with Ibou and Geraerts scoring the goals for the Leuven team. Thereafter, OHL loses against overachievers Zulte Waregem due to an injury-time winner by Habib Habibou. A late goal by Chuka had cancelled out an earlier goal by Habibou and seemed to be giving OHL a point, but Habibou decided otherwise. OHL thus finishes the year in 10th place with 28th points out of 22 matches, just one point less than the team earned during the whole 2011–12 Belgian Pro League.

Right before the end of the year, captain Kenneth Van Goethem is the third player to extend his contract. The midfielder adds three years and now has a contract until 2016.

January
With the winter transfer window opening, several teams in the Belgian Pro League decide to make some changes in their personnel. In the first week of 2013, OHL announces three new transfers: on 1 January, 18-year-old Belgian defender Cédric Buekers is signed from Belgian Second Division team Sint-Truiden until 2015, two days later the team also announces that two more players have been signed: 20-year-old Belgian striker Alessandro Cerigioni comes from Lommel United and is signed immediately, while defender Zainoul Haidara from Guinea will finish the season with his team FC Bleid-Gaume in the Belgian Third Division and join OHL in the summer of 2013.

OH Leuven continues to give players contract extensions, as both young striker Ben Yagan (18) and experienced Brazilian central defender Robson (29) prolong their stay in Leuven. Yagan is signed until 2015, Robson until 2016. One day later, Frederik Boi leaves the club as he moves back to his former team Cercle Brugge on loan. Due to several minor injuries, Boi had played only a few matches and had asked to be transferred and not to participate in the winter training camp with the rest of the team in Malta. With the contract of Boi expiring in 2013, it seems unlikely to see him return to OHL.

In the first match after the winter break, Lokeren holds a 0–2 lead at half-time through two goals by Benjamin Mokulu. Goals by Thomas Azevedo and Karel Geraerts allow OHL to draw level, but thereafter Lokeren manages to score four more goals to end the game 2–6. Although Waasland-Beveren only played with 10 players for almost 35 minutes after a red card, the non-winning streak continues and grows to 11 matches as OH Leuven loses 2–0 in Beveren.

Two more transfers are completed before the end of the transfer window: 31-year-old Croatian central defender Tomislav Mikulić is signed on loan from Beerschot until the end of the season, while striker Christian Pouga is loaned out to Lierse until the end of the season.

February
A goal by Chuka ends the spell without a win as it proves enough to beat Charleroi at home. For OHL it is the first win since 31 October, which could have been followed by a second win away to Club Brugge as the team were leading 0–1 with only half an hour to play, with former Club Brugge player Karel Geraerts putting OHL in front. However, after a red card for Kenny Thompson, Brugge took control and won 3–1. OHL again fails to win one week later against bottom league team Beerschot, with a late equalizer by Benito Raman cancelling out the goal by Ibou. However, the team responds with a 1–2 away win to Mechelen, with Koen Weuts and Chuka getting on the scoresheet. During that same match, Mazin Ahmed Al-Huthayfi is brought in as a substitute during the injury time. The signing of Al-Huthayfi had not been announced, causing eyebrows to be raised as to who was this player. Apparently, Al-Huthayfi was signed on loan from Ittihad FC until the end of the season.

March
OHL ends the regular season in a bad way after suffering a severe 0–4 loss at home against Standard Liège, with Imoh Ezekiel scoring for Standard after only 13 seconds, after which Logan Bailly saves a last minute penalty to keep Kortrijk to a 0–0 draw. Overall, OH Leuven was never in any danger of relegation and ends the season safely in tenth place with 36 points. Regarding the playoffs, the team is paired with Charleroi, Mechelen and Waasland-Beveren, against which the team scored 15 out of 18 points.

OHL starts the playoffs with a 3–1 victory over Waasland-Beveren. Youngsters Alessandro Cerigioni and Joren Dehond score their first league goal for Leuven, with the other goals coming from Chuka (for OHL) and Stijn De Smet for Waasland-Beveren.

April & May
The month of April starts with the news that Icelandic midfielder Stefán Gíslason signs a new contract to keep him with Leuven for another season, until 2014.

The victory against Waasland-Beveren is not followed up with more good performances, as Charleroi first takes revenge for the 0–4 loss during the regular competition, beating OHL 3–0 in Charleroi, after which Leuven loses again by three goals to nil, now at home to KV Mechelen. OH Leuven thereby drops to the last position in the group with only three points, but all is still open, as after three matches Charleroi has five points, while both KV Mechelen and Waasland-Beveren have four points.

After being down 1–0 at halftime to KV Mechelen in Mechelen, the season seems to be finished for OHL, but in the second half OHL comes back, scoring no less than five goals to take the win. Two goals came from Ibou, with the others provided by Alessandro Cerigioni, Tomislav Mikulić and Robson. In the following match at home against Charleroi, Ibou fails to score a penalty kick, which proves costly as the match ends 0–0. With three teams tied on 7 points and only Waasland-Beveren trailing on 5 points, OHL knows that a win away to Waasland-Beveren will win the group unless KV Mechelen wins by a larger margin in Charleroi. Mechelen grasps a late 1–2 win due to an injury time goal, but captain Bjorn Ruytinx, injured for most of the season and returning for the first time again in the starting lineup, scores a vital goal to hand OH Leuven the win against Waasland-Beveren. With that, OHL wins group B of the playoffs and will face group A winners Gent. With negotiations and rumours ongoing for a few weeks already, club icon Bjorn Ruytinx signs a new contract tying him to the club for one more season, until 2014.

In the playoff final, OHL proves to be no match for Gent, twice losing by four goals to one, first in Leuven, then in Ghent. The goals for Leuven came from Bjorn Ruytinx (at home) and Evariste Ngolok (in Ghent). With that, the season ends for OHL.

Team kit
The team kits for the 2012–13 season are produced by Vermarc and the main shirt sponsor is Option which is displayed on the front center of the shirt. Other sponsors featuring on the kit: Rayden Transport and Vermarc (shirt front), Dataflow and Lotto (shirt back), Tegel Concept (shirt sleeves) and Rayden Transport, GMS Leuven, Stad Leuven and Mercedes (shorts). OHL still plays in white during home matches, but now has green as primary colour for the away matches. A red outfit is available also as third kit. The goalkeeper kit is normally green during home matches and red during away matches, keeping in mind that it always needs to differ enough from the kit colour of the opponents.

First team squad
As of 15 January 2013. OHL Team 2012-13

Transfers

In

Summer

Winter

Loan In

Winter

Out

Summer

Loan Out

Summer

Winter

Statistics

Appearances and goals
Last updated on 19 May 2013.

|-
|colspan="10"|Players who are out on loan

|}

Top scorers
Includes all competitive matches.

Goals

Source: Match reports in Competitive matches.

Penalties Taken

Goals conceded 
Includes all competitive matches. Sorted by shirt number.

Penalties Conceded

Disciplinary record
Includes all competitive matches. Players with 1 card or more included only.

Last updated on 30 November 2012

Suspensions during the season 
Includes suspensions for competitive matches.

Last updated on 13 April 2013

Severe injuries during the season 
Last updated on 15 January 2013

Overall
{|class="wikitable"
|-
|Games played || 23 (22 Belgian Pro League, 1 Belgian Cup)
|-
|Games won || 6 (6 Belgian Pro League, 0 Belgian Cup)
|-
|Games drawn || 10 (10 Belgian Pro League, 0 Belgian Cup)
 |-
|Games lost || 7 (6 Belgian Pro League, 1 Belgian Cup)
|-
|Goals scored || 40
|-
|Goals conceded || 36
|-
|Goal difference || +4
|-
|Clean sheets || 2
|-
|Yellow cards || 47
|-
|Red cards || 2
|-
|Worst discipline ||  Jonas De Roeck, 7 yellow cards.
|-
|Best result(s) || W 0 – 4 (A) at Charleroi – Belgian Pro League – 6 October 2012
|-
|Worst result(s) || L 5 – 2 (A) at Mons – Belgian Pro League – 28 July 2012
|-
|Most appearances || 3 players with 18 appearances
|-
|Top scorer ||  Ibou, 16 goals
|-

Club

Coaching staff
{|class="wikitable"
!Position
!Staff
|-
|-
|Head coach|| Ronny Van Geneugden
|-
|rowspan=2|Assistant First Team Coach|| Arnold Rijsenburg
|-
| Hans Vander Elst 
|-
|Goalkeeping coach|| Jurgen De Braekeleer

Other information

Competitions

Friendly matches

Pre-season

During the season

Belgian Pro League

OHL's second season in the Belgian Pro League began on 28 July 2012.

Regular season

League table

Results summary

Points breakdown

Points at home: 21 
Points away from home: 15 
Points against 2011/12 Playoff 1 teams (6): 10 (27.78%)
Points against 2011/12 Playoff 2 teams (7): 17 (40.48%)
Points against newly promoted teams (2): 9 (75%)

6 points: Charleroi, Mechelen
4 points: Beerschot, Cercle Brugge
3 points: Club Brugge, Waasland-Beveren
2 points: Genk, Gent, Kortrijk, Lierse
1 point: Anderlecht, Lokeren
0 points: Mons, Standard Liège, Zulte Waregem

Biggest & smallest
Biggest home win: 5–2 vs. Waasland-Beveren; 4–1 vs. Club Brugge
Biggest home defeat: 2–6 vs. Lokeren
Biggest away win: 0–4 vs. Charleroi
Biggest away defeat: 5–2 vs. Mons

Biggest home attendance: 9,599 vs. Club Brugge, vs. Mechelen and vs. Standard Liège
Smallest home attendance: 6,746 vs. Cercle Brugge
Biggest away attendance: 23,800 vs. Club Brugge
Smallest away attendance: 3,500 vs. Mons

Results by round

Playoffs
After finishing 10th during the regular season, OHL was placed in Group B of the Europa League Playoff together with Mechelen, Charleroi and Waasland-Beveren.

Table

By winning playoff Group B, OHL qualified for the playoff final against Group A winners Gent. This two legged final was lost on aggregate 8–2, ending the season for OHL.

Matches

Belgian Cup

References

External links
 

2012-13
Belgian football clubs 2012–13 season
Oud-Heverlee Leuven seasons